USS Pilgrim has been the name of more than one United States Navy ship, and may refer to:

 , a canal boat purchased to be sunk as a blockship in 1864
 , a tug in commission from 1870 to 1871
 , a patrol vessel in commission from 1917 to 1919

See also
 , a river patrol boat commissioned in 1942 and stricken in 1947

Pilgrim